Muskiki is a word of Cree origin ("maskihkîy") meaning medicine, and may refer to:

Muskiki Formation, a stratigraphical unit of Late Cretaceous age in the Western Canadian Sedimentary Basin
Muskiki River, a tributary of the Nottaway River in Nord-du-Québec, Canada
Muskiki Springs, Saskatchewan, a community in Saskatchewan, Canada
Muskiki Creek (and Muskiki Lake), a tributary of the Cardinal River, Alberta, Canada